The Battle of Lleida took place on 7 October 1642, during the Catalan Revolt, part of the wider Franco-Spanish War (1635–1659). A combined Franco-Catalan army under Philippe de La Mothe-Houdancourt defeated a larger Spanish force led by Marquis de Leganés, sent to capture the town of Lleida.

Background
In the summer of 1642, an army commanded by Philippe de La Mothe-Houdancourt, French military commander in Catalonia, marched into Aragon. In order to divert him, Leganés assembled troops from Tarragona and Zaragoza to retake the important city of Lleida, then held by a French garrison. 

La Mothe positioned his smaller army in the Llano de las Forques and defeated the Spanish army. After the victory, the French Army besieged Tortosa, but was forced to withdraw.

References

Sources
 
 
 

Lleida
1642 in Spain
Lleida 1642